In enzymology, 1-phosphofructokinase is an enzyme that catalyzes the chemical reaction

ATP + D-fructose 1-phosphate → ADP + D-fructose 1,6-bisphosphate

Thus, the two substrates of this enzyme are ATP and D-fructose 1-phosphate, whereas its two products are ADP and D-fructose 1,6-bisphosphate. The enzyme was first described and characterized in the 1960s.

This enzyme belongs to the phosphofructokinase B (PfkB) or Ribokinase family of sugar kinases, specifically those transferring phosphorus-containing groups (phosphotransferases) with an alcohol group as acceptor.  The systematic name of this enzyme class is ATP:D-fructose-phosphate 6-phosphotransferase. Other names in common use include fructose-1-phosphate kinase, 1-phosphofructokinase (phosphorylating), D-fructose-1-phosphate kinase, fructose 1-phosphate kinase, and 1-phosphofructokinase.  This enzyme participates in fructose and mannose metabolism. The members of the PfkB/RK family are identified by the presence of three conserved sequence motifs and their enzymatic activity generally shows a dependence on the presence of pentavalent ions.

Structure
The protein is a homodimer.

References

EC 2.7.1
Enzymes of known structure